64th New York Film Critics Circle Awards
January 10, 1999

Best Picture:
 Saving Private Ryan 
The 64th New York Film Critics Circle Awards, honoring the best in film for 1998, were announced on 16 December 1998 and given on 10 January 1999.

Winners
Best Actor:
Nick Nolte - Affliction
Runners-up: Ian McKellen - Gods and Monsters and Brendan Gleeson - The General
Best Actress:
Cameron Diaz - There's Something About Mary
Runners-up: Fernanda Montenegro - Central Station (Central do Brasil) and Renée Zellweger - One True Thing and A Price Above Rubies
Best Cinematography:
John Toll - The Thin Red Line
Best Director:
Terrence Malick - The Thin Red Line
Runners-up: Steven Spielberg - Saving Private Ryan and Paul Schrader - Affliction
Best Film:
Saving Private Ryan
Runners-up: Affliction and Happiness
Best First Film:
Richard Kwietniowski - Love and Death on Long Island
Runners-up: Don Roos - The Opposite of Sex and Vincent Gallo - Buffalo '66
Best Foreign Language Film:
The Celebration (Festen) • Denmark/Sweden
Runners-up: Central Station (Central do Brasil) • Brazil/France and Taste of Cherry (Ta'm e guilass) • Iran
Best Non-Fiction Film:
The Farm: Angola, USA
Runner-up: The Cruise
Best Screenplay:
Marc Norman and Tom Stoppard - Shakespeare in Love
Runners-up: Todd Solondz - Happiness and Wes Anderson and Owen Wilson - Rushmore
Best Supporting Actor:
Bill Murray - Rushmore 
Runner-up: Dylan Baker - Happiness
Best Supporting Actress:
Lisa Kudrow - The Opposite of Sex
Runner-up: Judi Dench - Shakespeare in Love
Special Award:
Rick Schmidlin - Touch of Evil (for the reworked version)

References

External links
1998 Awards

1998
New York Film Critics Circle Awards
1988 in American cinema
New York
1998 in New York City